Ergometer may refer to:

Exercise machine, equipped with an apparatus for measuring the work performed by exercising
Indoor rower, called an ergometer by rowers
 An instrument for measuring the amount of work done by human muscles

Ergometer comes from the Greek words ergon  (ἔργον), meaning work, and metron (μέτρον), meaning measure. "Ergometer", therefore, literally means "work measurer". A bike, fitted with mechanical work measurement devices is also an ergometer.

See also
Erg, the unit of energy and mechanical work in the centimetre-gram-second system
Dynamometer, a machine used to measure force or mechanical power